30 Ophiuchi is a single star in the equatorial constellation of Ophiuchus, and figures 0.99° east (specifically E½S) of the heart of cluster Messier 10. It is visible to the naked eye as a faint, orange-hued point of light with an apparent visual magnitude of 4.82. The distance to this star is approximately 350 light years based on parallax. Its present motion is, net, one of approaching rather than parting, at −6.7 km/s, its "radial velocity".

This is an aging giant star with a stellar classification of K4III, having exhausted the supply of hydrogen at its core and expanded to 36 times the Sun's radius. It is a suspected variable star.

The primary presents with two visual companions: B, at magnitude 9.71 and separation 99.8″, and C, at magnitude 8.75 and separation 220.9″ (3′ 40.9″).

References

K-type giants
Suspected variables
Ophiuchus (constellation)
BD-04 4215
Ophiuchi, 30
153687
083262
6318